Musica è (English: "music is") is a mini album and the fourth album recorded by Italian pop and rock singer-songwriter Eros Ramazzotti, produced by Piero Cassano and was released in 1988 on the chpre BMG label. Two versions of the album exist: a five track release and an expanded eight track version, which includes two remixed tracks from Ramazzotti's previous album In certi momenti.

Track listing 
(All tracks written by Pierangelo Cassano, Adelio Cogliati, Eros Ramazzotti)

5 track version
 "Musica è" – 11:00
 "Ti sposerò perché" – 4:02
 "In segno d'amicizia" – 3:53 
 "Solo con te" – 5:04 
 "Uno di noi" – 3:51
8 track version
 "Musica è" – 11:00 
 "La luce buona delle stelle" (remix) – 4:47
 "Ti sposerò perché" – 4:02
 "In segno d'amicizia" – 3:53
 "Solo con te" – 5:04 
 "Uno di noi" – 3:51 
 "Voglio volare" – 3:38
 "Occhi di speranza" (remix) – 3:16

Chart performance

Certifications and sales

References

1988 albums
Eros Ramazzotti albums
Italian-language albums
Spanish-language albums
Sony Music Italy albums